Nanri Island, Nanjisü, Nanjih, historically known as Nanni Shan and Nanri Shan, is a small island off the coast of China. Nanri Town is an administrative unit of Xiuyu District, Putian, Fujian, People's Republic of China which includes 111 islands and islets.

History 
In October 1952, the island was the site of the Battle of Nanri Island between the People's Liberation Army and the Republic of China Army; the engagement ended in an ROC victory and resulted in the ROC occupying Nanri. However, ROC forces later withdrew to Taiwan, and the island was re-occupied by the People's Republic of China.

Administrative divisions
The town of Nanri (which includes nearby islands) is divided into seventeen villages:
 Haishan, Yunwan, Yanxia, Shipan, Shanchu, Wanfeng, Sandun, Xigao, Shayang, Gangnan, Fuye, Houye, Dongdai, Xiaori, Aoyu (also known as Ta-ao Hsü), Luopan, Chishan

Other populated places include Fou-tou, Hsi-hu, Hsi-kao, Ts'ao-hu, T'ou-ying-shih, Ts'u-shan, Shih-t'ou-p'an and Shang-t'ou.

Economy
The island is heavily involved in the fishing industry, and several fish farms have been established off the coast of the island. The island's mudflats are cultivated for seaweed and kelp production. In 2015, a wind farm was established on the island.

Gallery
Maps including Nanri Island:

References 

Islands of the South China Sea
Islands of Fujian
Township-level divisions of Fujian
Putian